Enrique "Quique" Álvarez Sanjuán (born 20 July 1975) is a Spanish retired footballer who played as a central defender.

In a 16-year professional career he appeared in 370 games, 201 in La Liga. Having started his career at Barcelona, where he had no impact for its first team – one match – he would be an important member of Villarreal's top-flight consolidation, representing the club for seven years.

Playing career
Álvarez was born in Vigo, Galicia. Grown through the ranks of FC Barcelona, he played only one La Liga game for the Catalans in the 1995–96 season, then spent one loan stint with CD Logroñés before being released, after which he joined Barça neighbours UE Lleida (both teams were in the Segunda División). 

Álvarez made a name for himself during his spell at Villarreal CF, where he was team captain when a starter. Having made 250 competitive appearances – second-most for the club behind Argentine Rodolfo Arruabarrena– his role would diminish in the 2006–07 campaign however, as Villarreal finished fifth (only 15 matches).

In July 2007, Álvarez joined Recreativo de Huelva, where his season would be constantly bothered by injuries. In one of his few league appearances, on 1 March 2008, he was sent off for a dangerous challenge on Real Madrid's Arjen Robben after just six minutes on the pitch (the former was brought on in the 64'), during a 2–3 home loss. In 2008–09 he only took part in one league game for already doomed Recre, a 2–1 defeat at Sporting de Gijón in the last round, and was subsequently released.

Coaching career
Retired at 34, Álvarez moved into coaching, starting with Barcelona's Juvenil A. He returned to Villarreal on 26 September 2017, as part of his former teammate Javier Calleja's staff; the pair were fired on 10 December 2018, being reinstated the following 29 January after the dismissal of Luis García.

Álvarez and Calleja later worked together at Deportivo Alavés.

Personal life
Álvarez's father, Quique Costas, also a footballer and a defender, played professionally with RC Celta de Vigo and Barcelona. He later became a manager, coinciding with his son on one occasion.

Álvarez's younger brother, Óscar, who occupied the same position, played mainly in the second and third tiers.

Honours
Villarreal
UEFA Intertoto Cup: 2003, 2004

References

External links

1975 births
Living people
Spanish footballers
Footballers from Catalonia
Footballers from Vigo
Association football defenders
La Liga players
Segunda División players
FC Barcelona Atlètic players
FC Barcelona players
CD Logroñés footballers
UE Lleida players
Villarreal CF players
Recreativo de Huelva players
Spain under-21 international footballers
Spain under-23 international footballers
Catalonia international footballers
Villarreal CF non-playing staff